Pablo Eitel (11 April 1888 – 29 August 1972) was a Chilean sprinter. He competed in the men's 100 metres at the 1912 Summer Olympics.

References

1888 births
1972 deaths
Athletes (track and field) at the 1912 Summer Olympics
Chilean male sprinters
Olympic athletes of Chile
Place of birth missing